Mustvee Parish is a rural municipality in Jõgeva County. It includes the town of Mustvee.

Settlements
Town
Mustvee

Boroughs
Avinurme, Lohusuu

Villages
There are 56 villages: Adraku, Alekere, Halliku, Jaama, Jõemetsa, Kaasiku, Kaevussaare, Kallivere, Kalmaküla, Kasepää, Kiisli, Kiissa, Koseveski, Kõrve, Kõrvemetsa, Kõveriku, Kärasi, Kääpa, Kükita, Laekannu, Lepiksaare, Levala, Maardla, Maetsma, Metsaküla, Nautrasi, Ninasi, Nõmme, Odivere, Omedu, Paadenurme, Pedassaare, Piilsi, Putu, Pällu, Raadna, Raja, Ruskavere, Saarjärve, Separa, Sirguvere, Sälliksaare, Tammessaare, Tammispää, Tarakvere, Tiheda, Tuulavere, Ulvi, Vadi, Vanassaare, Vassevere, Veia, Vilusi, Voore, Võtikvere, Änniksaare.

Religion

References